The Queen's Award for Enterprise: International Trade (Export) (2008) was awarded on 21 April 2008, by Queen Elizabeth II.

Recipients
The following organisations were awarded this year.

 2 entertain Limited of London W1 for DVD/Video and music publishing.
 Advanced New Technologies Limited of Hull for electronic systems for the super yacht industry.
 Alwayse Engineering Limited of Birmingham, West Midlands for ball transfer units.
 Aquaspersions Limited of Halifax, West Yorkshire for speciality chemical dispersion and emulsion products for the water based polymer industry.
 Audio Processing Technology Ltd of Belfast, Northern Ireland for broadcast audio equipment.
 Authentix Limited of York for brand protection and product authentication.
 BACTEC International Limited of Rochester, Kent for explosive ordnance disposal and landmine clearance.
 J & A Beare Ltd of London W1 for restorers of antique stringed musical instruments and bows.
 Benoy Limited of Newark, Nottinghamshire for architecture, masterplanning, interior and graphic design.
 The British Showcase Group Ltd (trading as Click Netherfield) of Livingston, West Lothian, for specialist museum display cases.
 CVI Technical Optics Limited of Onchan, Isle of Man for laser optical components.
 Canyon Europe Ltd of Newtownabbey, County Antrim for trigger sprayers and pump dispensers.
 Cape PLC, International Division of Uxbridge, Middlesex for thermal insulation and other industrial services.
 Centek Ltd of Newton Abbot, Devon for casing centralisers and stop collars for the oil and gas industry.
 I & G Cohen Limited of Salford, Greater Manchester for second hand clothing, footwear and household textiles.
 Cummins Ltd, Darlington Engine Plant of Darlington, County Durham for diesel engines and components
 Delfield Precision Engineering Co. Ltd of Ruislip, Middlesex for casings for radiation shielding.
 Downhole Products Plc of Portlethen, Aberdeen, for oil well products.
 Scotland DUCO Ltd of Newcastle upon Tyne for subsea umbilical systems.
 Euromoney Institutional Investor PLC of London EC4 for financial and business publishing, conference organisers and electronic information and data provider.
 Europlus Direct Ltd of Saltaire, West Yorkshire for information technology services.
 Evolution Securities China Limited of London EC3 for investment banking and securities.
 Excelsior Technologies of Flint, Wales for specialist food packaging
 Fairline Boats Ltd of Oundle, Northamptonshire for luxury powerboats.
 Fast React Systems Ltd of Derby for software design and sales.
 Fintec Crushing & Screening Ltd of Dungannon, County Tyrone for mobile crushing and screening equipment.
 Fort Vale Engineering Ltd of Burnley, Lancashire for valves, manways and accessories for the transport and storage of bulk liquids, gases and powders.
 Fortress Interlocks Limited of Wolverhampton, for safety interlock systems.
 Garrad Hassan Group Limited of Bristol for renewable energy consultancy.
 Gripple Ltd of Sheffield, South Yorkshire for wire joining and tensioning devices for use in agricultural and construction industries.
 Group 4 Technology Ltd of Tewkesbury, Gloucestershire for access control and security products.
 Haztec International Limited of Leeds, West Yorkshire for vehicle warning equipment for the emergency and municipal services.
 Humax Electronics Co. Ltd of London TW8 Digital set top boxes and for LCD televisions.
 Huthwaite International of Rotherham, South Yorkshire for sales and management training consultancy.
 Hyder Consulting PLC of London SW1 for advisory and design services in property and infrastructure.
 Independent Forgings & Alloys Ltd of Sheffield, South Yorkshire for specialist open die forgings, rolled rings, precision forged bars in nickel alloys, titanium and steels.
 Inflight Peripherals Limited of Newport, Isle of Wight for electronic equipment for in-flight entertainment systems.
 The International Student Centre of Ealing, London W14 for vocational education, professional and post graduate.
 Hammersmith and West London College for training programmes.
 Ivory & Ledoux Limited of London NW3 for raw materials, juice concentrate, pulps and purees.
 JCB Backhoe Loader Business Unit of Rocester, Staffordshire for backhoe loader excavators.
 JCB Service of Uttoxeter, Staffordshire for parts and accessories for earth moving machines.
 Keltie of London EC4 - patent and trade mark attorneys
 LC & M Ltd of Lincoln for crankshafts for the oil and gas industry.
 Land Rover Holdings of Gaydon, Warwickshire for 4 x 4 Vehicles, parts, accessories and lifestyle products
 Llanllyr Water Company Limited of Lampeter, Ceredigion, Wales for bottled spring water.
 Loch Duart Ltd of Scourie, Sutherland Fresh farmed for Scottish salmon.
 Scotland MSI Recruitment Ltd of London SE1 for recruitment agency.
 J. Marr (Seafoods) Ltd of Hull for frozen pelagic fish.
 Motorola Point to Point Fixed Wireless Solutions Group of Ashburton, Devon for broadband solutions bridging and extending high-speed voice and data networks, for secure and reliable connectivity.
 Owen Mumford Limited of Woodstock, Oxfordshire for medical disposables.
 Oceanair Marine Limited of Selsey, West Sussex for window coverings, hatch blinds and screens for boats, vehicles and homes.
 Online Electronics Limited of Aberdeen, Scotland for pipeline pig monitoring equipment, and pipeline data communications systems.
 Pace Micro Technology plc of Saltaire, West Yorkshire Digital for tV technology developers.
 Pentland Group Plc of London W1 for clothing and footwear.
 Pharmaterials Ltd of Reading, Berkshire for pharmaceutical materials testing, polymorphism, salt selection, inhaled and solid oral dose formulation.
 Picsel Technologies Limited of Glasgow, Scotland for mobile software development.
 PolicyPlus International plc of Bath for traded endowment policies.
 Powerlase Limited of Crawley, West Sussex for industrial lasers.
 Quest Personal Care Global Limited of Manchester for disposable personal care products.
 RBS WorldPay of London EC2 a multi currency card and payment processor.
 Rapiscan Systems Limited of Redhill, Surrey for security x-ray and metal detection screening products.
 John Reid & Sons (Strucsteel) Ltd of Christchurch, Dorset for steel framed buildings, bridges and other structures.
 Romo Ltd of Kirkby in Ashfield for furnishing and upholstery fabrics and wall coverings.
 Nottinghamshire STG Aerospace Ltd of Swaffham, Norfolk for next generation emergency power systems, and photoluminescent emergency floorpath marking systems for aircraft.
 Sheffield Forgemasters International Limited of Sheffield, South Yorkshire for large steel castings and forgings.
 Signet International Limited of Colnbrook, Berkshire for freight forwarding services.
 Leonard Simmonds Associates Ltd (trading as LSA) of Malvern, Worcestershire for traded endowment insurance policies for endowments.
 Spirit Yachts Ltd of Ipswich, Suffolk for sailing yachts and power boats.
 The Sporting Exchange (trading as Betfair) of London W6 for betting services and online gaming products
 Superior Group Limited of Wimborne, Dorset for precision rubber seals.
 Symbian Ltd of London SE1 for mobile phone software development and licensing
 TRL Technology Ltd of Tewkesbury, Gloucestershire for design, manufacture and integration of innovative defence solutions.
 TRP Sealing Systems Ltd of Hereford for elastomeric gaskets.
 TRW Occupant Safety Systems - Peterlee of Peterlee, County Durham for automotive occupant safety systems
 TTP Group plc of Melbourn, Hertfordshire for technology and product development.
 Thermserve Limited of Telford, Shropshire for equipment for the aluminium industry.
 Vascutek Limited of Inchinnan, Renfrewshire, for vascular prostheses for human implant.
 Vitabiotics Ltd of London NW2 for vitamin supplements and nutraceuticals.
 Vodec Industrial Communications Ltd of Nottingham for public address and general alarm systems.
 Weir Minerals Europe Limited of Todmorden, Lancashire for abrasion and corrosion resistant slurry equipment.
 Wirth Research Limited of Whittlebury, for automotive research and development.
 Xiros plc of Leeds, West Yorkshire Innovative medical implants used in minimally-invasive and tissue-sparing surgical procedures

References

Queen's Award for Enterprise: International Trade (Export)
2008 in the United Kingdom